Summerfield Township is the name of some places in the U.S. state of Michigan:

 Summerfield Township, Clare County, Michigan
 Summerfield Township, Monroe County, Michigan

Michigan township disambiguation pages